The USA Team Handball College National Championships is a team handball tournament to determine the Men's and Women's College National Champion from the United States.

History
The best college team from the Nationals was recognized as College champion until 1996.
After the Olympic Games in 1996 in Atlanta the College Nationals were founded.

Record champion is by both gender West Point (Army) they have a total of 58 titles.

Men's

Record champion is the West Point with at minimum 34 titles the college has also the most continuous titles with fourteen from 2007 until now.

Women's

Record champion is the West Point with at minimum 18 titles the college has also the most continuous titles with seven from 2012 until 2017.

Medal count

Men's Medal count

Women's Medal count

Total Medal count

References